The Famennian is the latter of two faunal stages in the Late Devonian Epoch. The most recent estimate for its duration estimates that it lasted from around 371.1 million years ago to 359.3 million years ago. An earlier 2012 estimate, still used by the International Commission on Stratigraphy, estimated that it lasted from  million years ago to  million years ago. It was preceded by the Frasnian stage and followed by the Tournaisian stage.

Major events 
In the seas, a novel major group of ammonoid cephalopods called clymeniids appeared, underwent tremendous diversification and spread worldwide, then just as suddenly went extinct.

The beginning of the Famennian is marked by the final stages of a major extinction event, the Kellwasser Event, which is the largest component of the Late Devonian Mass extinction. The end of the Famennian experiences a smaller but still quite severe extinction event, the Hangenberg Event. A brief episode of glaciation, possibly linked to the Hangenberg event, occurred during the late Famennian, the first in a series of short glaciations that preceded the Late Palaeozoic ice age of the Carboniferous and Permian periods.

Subdivisions 
The International Commission on Stratigraphy divides the Famennian into four informal substages based primarily on conodont zonation. The Famennian corresponds to four historical subdivisions in German stratigraphy: the Nehdenian, Hembergian, Dasbergian, and Wocklumian (from oldest to youngest). However, these are based solely on ammonoid zonation and do not precisely correspond to the informal ICS subdivisions. The Uppermost Famennian substage (approximating the Wocklumian) is also known as the Strunian in the Ardennes region.

North American subdivisions of the Famennian include the Chautauquan, Canadaway, Conneaut, Conneautan, Conewango and Conewangan.

Name and definition 
The Famennian Stage was proposed in 1855 by Belgian geologist André Hubert Dumont and was accepted for the upper stage of the Upper Devonian by the Subcommission on Devonian Stratigraphy in 1981. It is named after Famenne, a natural region in southern Belgium. The lower GSSP, ratified in 1993, is located within the Coumiac Formation near Cessenon in southern France.

Since 2017, the base of the Famennian has been defined by a distinctive turnover of conodonts, particularly the last appearance of Palmatolepis bogartensis, the first appearance of Palmatolepis subperlobata, and an increase in the abundance of Palmatolepis ultima. It was previously defined by the start of the Palmatolepis triangularis conodont zone, but later studies showed that P. triangularis first appeared slightly later than the main conodont turnover in the GSSP.

A 2012 ICS timescale based on rough radioisotopic records estimated the Famennian began around 372.2 ± 1.6 Ma, and ended at 358.9 ± 0.4 Ma. In 2020 this was revised to a start at 371.1 ± 1.1 Ma and an end at 359.3 ± 0.3 Ma.

References

See also 
 List of fossil sites (with link directory)

 
Late Devonian
Devonian geochronology
.